The Operative Plasterers' and Cement Masons' International Association of the United States and Canada (OPCMIA) is a trade union of plasterers and cement masons in the construction industry in the United States and Canada. Members of the union finish interior walls and ceilings of buildings and apply plaster on masonry, metal, and wire lath or gypsum. Cement masons are responsible for all concrete construction, including pouring and finishing of slabs, steps, wall tops, curbs and gutters, sidewalks, and paving. The organization is a member union of the AFL–CIO and Canadian Labour Congress.

History
The union traces its roots to the era of the American Civil War, when an organization known variously as the National Plasterer's Union or the National Plasterers Organization attempted to unify the various local craft unions that represented workers in the trade. The new organization attempted to establish standard wages and working conditions, regulate the training of apprentices, establish a traveling card system to permit union members to travel from one local's jurisdiction to another, while excluding those unfit for membership.

The modern organization was formed in 1882, when a number of locals who had supported the Cincinnati, Ohio local in a strike earlier that year met in St. Louis, Missouri to reestablish a national organization. The new union endorsed the eight-hour day while pledging to avoid "unnecessary strikes." The union amended its constitution in 1887 to include Canadian workers. In 1914 the union was renamed the Operative Plasterers' and Cement Finishers' International Association, and the following year it reached an agreement with the United Brotherhood of Cement Workers to bring those workers into the union.

In 1946 the union established a program, in conjunction with the Contracting Plasterers' International Association and the Associated General Contractors, to establish national apprentice training standards. The union trained a large number of veterans of World War II in its apprenticeship programs, while curtailing the competition from non-union contractors. In the late 1960s, the union opened up its apprenticeship programs to allow more African-American and Latino workers into its locals.

In 1960 the union followed many other U.S. unions in moved its headquarters, transferring them from Cleveland to the Washington, D.C. region. It is currently headquartered at Columbia, Maryland.

Presidents
1882: Michael Mulvihill
1883: James W. Smith
?
John H. Donlin
Michael J. Colleran
1942: John E. Rooney
1959: Edward J. Leonard
1970: Joseph P. Power
1981: Melvin H. Roots
Robert J. Holton
1996: John J. Dougherty
2007: Patrick Finley
2016: Daniel Stepano

See also

 Concrete finisher

References

External links
 
 Profile of the work of plasterers and stucco masons from the Occupational Outlook Handbook

AFL–CIO
Canadian Labour Congress
Plasterers' trade unions
Trade unions established in 1882